

Creative Economy Definition of the Park Geun-hye Administration
During her 2013 inaugural address, President Park Geun-hye defined the creative economy as:
"A creative economy is defined by the convergence of science and technology with industry, the fusion of culture with industry, and the blossoming of creativity in the very borders that were once permeated by barriers. It is about going beyond the rudimentary expansion of existing markets, and creating new markets and new jobs by building on the bedrock of convergence. At the very heart of a creative economy lie science technology and the IT industry, areas that I have earmarked as key priorities".

Creative Economy Policy Enforcement Process of the Park Geun-hye Administration

Park Geun-hye first defined this term as a presidential candidate in the 2012 publication of Creative Economy. Since 2013, President Park Geun-hye has announced various policies to fulfill the creative economy and perform the related tasks.

In Creative Economy, Park suggested seven strategies to lay the foundation for a creative economy: creation of new markets and jobs; development of software as a future growing business; realization of the creative economy through opening and sharing; realization of nation for start-up ; construction of a recruitment system to look beyond specifications; promotion of K-Move in which Korean youths move the world ; and the creation of MSIP (Ministry of Science, ICT and Future Planning). President Park's 28 May 2013 Cabinet meeting announced the major government initiatives to shape the 140 government projects that the 18th Commission on Presidential Transition had announced through cross-governmental reviews, such as reflection of departmental action plans and review of resources. These four government administration keynotes were: economic rehabilitation, national welfare, culture prosperity, and establishment of a foundation for peaceful unification. On economic rehabilitation, the government suggested 22 creative economy-related tasks, such as construction of a creative economy ecosystem, promotion of venture businesses as well as small and medium-sized businesses, development of a new industry and market, and so on.

Action Plan for Creative Economy
In her first year in office, the Park Guen-hye administration concentrated on disseminating the concept of a creative economy and centering the realization of it on scientific technology and ICT. The MSIP and related authorities announced the Action Plan for the Creative Economy on 4 June 2013 for full-fledged enforcement of major government projects. The Park Guen-hye administration established the "Realization of National Welfare and New Era of Hope through the Creative Economy" as its vision and announced three objectives (creation of jobs and market, reinforcement of creative economy global leadership, and a society that respects creativity), six strategies, and 24 promotional tasks. Also, the Park Guen-hye administration suggested roles and assignments by department as promotional strategies for the Korean creative economy that involved scientific technology and ICT. This was to acknowledge the limitations of advanced countries' catch-up strategies for the last 40 years and to announce the conversion into an economic paradigm to create jobs.

[Strategy 1] Creation of the ecosystem in which creativity is rewarded fairly and it is easy to start a new company
 (Promotional Task 1-1) To expand investment in creative idea and technology
 (Promotional Task 1-2) To create an environment where it is easy to establish a start-up
 (Promotional Task 1-3) To convert ideas and technologies into intellectual properties and to protect, utilize, and promote the same
 (Promotional Task 1-4) To vitalize the commercialization of creative property
 (Promotional Task 1-5) To construct a start-up safety network with which it may be possible to try again

[Strategy 2] Strengthening of the global advance and playing a leading role in the creative economy by venture business and small & medium-sized businesses.
 (Promotional Task 2-1) To establish the foundation for the growth of venture business as well as small and medium-sized businesses
 (Promotional Task 2-2) To support the global market development of venture business as well as small and medium-sized businesses
 (Promotional Task 2-3) To promote the coexistence and cooperation among large businesses as well as small and medium-sized businesses
 (Promotional Task 2-4) To solve difficulties, such as labor shortage, etc., of venture businesses as well as small and medium-sized businesses

[Strategy 3] Creation of the new growth engine to develop new products and new markets
 (Promotional Task 3-1) To create a new growth engine of the existing industry through the convergence of scientific technology and ICT
 (Promotional Task 3-2) To develop SW and Internet-based new industry and high-value contents industry
 (Promotional Task 3-3) To create a new market through human-centered technology innovation
 (Promotional Task 3-4) To develop a new market through the discovery and promotion of a new promising industry
 (Promotion Task 3-5) To promote industrial convergence and market creation through regulation rationalization

[Strategy 4] Training of creative global talents
 (Promotional Task 4-1) To reinforce the convergence creative talent training
 (Promotional Task 4-2) To expand education in order to infuse competitiveness and entrepreneurship
 (Promotional Task 4-3) To vitalize the overseas expansion and domestic inflow of creative talents

[Strategy 5] Strengthening competency to innovate S&T and ICT as foundations for the creative economy 
 (Promotional Task 5-1) To improve the R&D system to expand potential and strengthen commercialization
 (Promotional Task 5-2) To reinforce ICT innovation competency and to accelerate the creative economy
 (Promotional Task 5-3) To reinforce the cooperation of industry, academy, research institution, and local government in order to create jobs
 (Promotional Task 5-4) To reinforce the roles of scientific technology and ICT to solve global problems

[Strategy 6] Development of the creative economy culture in which people and government work together
 (Promotional Task 6-1) To develop an environment of creativity and imagination
 (Promotional Task 6-2) To fuse public resources and national ideas through Government 3.0
 (Promotional Task 6-3) To innovate methods with which the government operates to realize the creative economy

Third S&T Basic Plan
In July 2013, the Third S&T Basic Plan reinforced core measures for the realization of a creative economy for science and technology. This plan is the most comprehensive one in the field of science and technology, established every five years pursuant to Article 7 of the Framework Act on Science and Technology, and called for the expansion of 21 legal requirements. In addition, for R&D, it called for the economic growth field to the quality of life field to link with the Action Plan for the Creative Economy, making the R&D phase include technology transfer, commercialization, and job creation, as well as reflecting various medium and long-term plans for the field of science and technology.

Three-Year Plan for Economic & Creative Economy Innovation Center
In its second year in power, the Park Geun-hye administration unveiled in March 2014 the "Three-Year Plan for Economic Innovation" that analyzed policies and suggested alternatives to problems such as the fixation of rent seeking, low economic dynamics, and overly weighted growth toward exports rather than domestic consumption.11 The plan suggested three main directions for future economic policies: 1) "economy with sound foundation" through the normalization of abnormality; 2) "dynamic innovative economy" through the creative economy; and 3) "economy in which domestic consumption and export are balanced" through the revitalization of the domestic consumption. The following 11 tasks were suggested for these promotional directions: vitalization of online creative economic town under a dynamic creative economy category; construction and diffusion of off-line creative economy innovation centers; enhancement of the competitiveness of small and medium-sized businesses; solution of management difficulties for growth of start-ups into small and medium-sized businesses; diffusion of environment for start-up and rechallenge; virtuous cycle of investment fund; expansion of M&A purchase foundation; expansion of M&A incentives; M&A deregulation; and the development of convergence new industry. The plan contains more concrete action plans for the realization of the creative economy, such as the proposal of an annual action roadmap through 2017.

In the plan, the Korean government placed special emphasis on the creative economy innovation center—one for each of the 17 local governments through 2015. Each creative economy innovation center is a nonprofit corporation that is selected from organizations that belong to or are affiliated with public institutions, economic organizations, universities, research institutions, etc., through the consultation of the Minister of Science, ICT and Future Planning, a head of the relevant organization, and the city mayor or governor. The creative economy innovation center, as a regional innovation base, supports the growth and overseas expansion of small and medium-sized businesses in specialized regional industry fields through linkage and cooperation among economic innovation subjects. That is, the creative economy innovation center is an organization that supervises the realization and diffusion of the local creative economy, such as the development of local society, training of talents and businesses, etc., by fostering the center as a core base for the realization of the local creative economy. In particular, the creative economy innovation center applies various support methods and models, such as nurturing a field that the relevant large business has the advantage as a specialized local industry by matching one local government and one large business.

In addition, the creative economy innovation center, with an online creative economy town (www.creativekorea.or.kr) completed in September 2013, serves as a core off-line platform for the realization of the creative economy and outcome creation. It allows various economic subjects—individuals or businesses—to collaborate and share ideas online, to support each other on mutual topics of interest (such as technology or commercialization strategies), and to have access to expert mentoring. Additional support, such as an application for intellectual property rights or a prototype for manufacturing expenses, is also provided.

Uneasy Settlement Process of the Creative Economy: Cause of Controversy over the Creative Economy of the Park Geun-hye Administration
The definitions of creative economy and creative industry were not brand new concepts. However, the ambiguous concept of a creative economy and its policy enforcement was at the heart of controversy among the National Assembly, media, and people. Professor Galloway at the University of Glasgow stated in his paper that the British government used the terms of creative industry and cultural industry confusingly in the enforcement of the creative economy policy. In 2012, the Ministry of Economy, Trade and Industry in Japan, as well as the Nomura Research Institute, redefined creative industry as "an industry that is composed of product, business, talent, etc., which are selected in a market through the added value of creativity rather than price". The Japanese government suggested that the creative industry may differ based on the policy and competitiveness of the related industry by adding three new fields, such as advertisement, art, and design, to the six fields that were proposed in the Cool Japan Strategy, which was the strategy to promote the creative industry.

In addition, the UN predicted that the creative industry, as the most dynamic field in the world's economy, would provide developing countries with opportunities for new and high economic development. The organization published creative economy reports in 2008 and 2010. The creative economy has been carried out globally by advanced countries, developing countries, local governments, and international organizations. The 2010 UN creative report defined the creative economy as follows: "an evolving concept based on creative asset that potentially generates economic growth and development". Regardless of how the creative industries are defined and classified, there is no disagreement that they lay at the center of what can be labeled, in broader terms, the creative economy.

As shown above, creative industry may differ based on how the government defines its scope, which will impact how a creative economy is viewed, therefore both are seen as dynamic concepts. There are still controversies over these concepts in Korea for two reasons. The first one is the compatibility of the term. The term "creative economy" was first suggested in Creative Economy, written by John Howkins in 2001, which described the relationship between creativity and the economy and Creative Strategy Management and Know-how in the Creative Era, a report by the Nomura Research Institute, which suggested the creative society as a paradigm to follow the information-oriented society. It proposed for the first time the creative industry as a new growth engine to value the worth and roles of creative activities. As illustrated above, creative economy, creative industry, and creative city have been widely used domestically and overseas. In Korea, these terms have been widely used in the regional development and cultural industry fields. However, when the term "creative economy", which had been used in state affairs philosophy, collided with the existing creative economy ecosystem, the confusion occurred. For example, local governments such as Seoul and Busan had already implemented strategies to promote the creative industry. Icheon (crafts and folk art), Seoul (design), and Jeonju (gastronomy) were selected for the creative city network that UNESCO constructed to share experiences, ideas, and model cases for cultural, societal, and economic development of cities since 2004.

Another cause of the controversy was the fact that the Park Geun-hye administration did not set the scope of creative industry to specific industrial fields or scientific technology fields, but instead emphasized the convergence of scientific technology, industry, culture, and industry. Thus, it was impossible to measure and explain the effects of creative economy policy, such as industry scale, employment scale, and economic ripple effects. It was also difficult for people to understand investment in the creative economy in terms of specific outcomes.

The budget of the creative economy rather than the creative industry has been set since 2014. It does not include R&D investment for the creative industry, but does include government-supported projects in six categories: creation of a start-up ecosystem, support for venture businesses as well as small and medium-sized businesses, development of new industry and markets, training of globally creative talents, reinforcement of S&T and ICT capability, and culture creation for the creative economy. The cross-department creative economy budget in 2015 was 8.3302 trillion won, which showed a 17.1 percent (1.2192 trillion won) increase compared with 7.1 trillion won in 2014. This accounted for 44.3 percent of the gross government R&D budget (18.8245 trillion won) for 2015. In particular, the "creation of a start-up ecosystem" and "support for venture businesses as well as small and medium-sized businesses" showed a 38.6 percent (468 billion won) increase compared to 2014, and the "development of new industry and market" showed an 18.8 percent (560.9 billion won) increase compared to 2014. This illustrates that the Park Geun-hye administration focuses on outcomes of the creative economy that use scientific technologies.

Creative Economy-related Organizations,
In May 2014, MSIP abolished the Creative Economy Commission composed of the Minister of MSIP, a chairman, vice-ministers of relevant authorities, and members to coordinate and deliberate the main policies related to the creative economy. Instead, Park Geun-hye reorganized governance to promote creative economy leadership and department cooperation, and emphasize the creative economy led by the private sector with the following organizations: Public–Private Creative Economy Committee under the MSIP; Creative Economy Initiative Public–Private Partnership; Creative Economy Innovation Center; Steering Committee for Creative Economy Initiative Public–Private Partnership; and the Regional Creative Economy Committee

Public–Private Creative Economy Committee

[Purpose] Creative economy-related cooperation channel between the public and the private sectors
[Main Function] Consult and coordinate the following matters related to the creative economy 
– Cooperation of the public and the private sectors
– Discovery and enforcement of public and private cooperation tasks as well as the inspection of enforcement and outcomes thereof
– Collection of opinion and proposal of private sector for government policies

Creative Economy Initiative Public–Private Partnership

[Purpose] Discovery and enforcement of public and private cooperation tasks related to the creative economy as well as efficient support for local creative economy
[Main Function] 
– Discovery, planning, and enforcement of public and private cooperation projects for new industry and growth engine 
– Discovery of enforcement projects for start-up vitalization as well as promotion of venture business and small and medium-sized business
– Planning and enforcement of program related to the diffusion of the creative economy culture
– Support for the operation of creative economy valley

Steering Committee for Creative Economy Initiative Public–Private Partnership

[Purpose] Deliberation and coordination of matters with respect to the realization and diffusion of the creative economy through the cooperation among government, local government, and private businesses
[Main Function] 
– Matters with respect to the cooperation of national and local government
– Inspection of private and public cooperation, policy establishment, task discovery, and outcome as well as the deliberation and coordination of the collection of private opinion and recommendation for governments

Creative Economy Innovation Center

[Purpose] An essential base for the creative economy, which supervises the realization and diffusion of local creative economy
[Main Function] To promote the following matters in the relevant local government:
– Support for small and medium-sized businesses and supervision of connection between the relevant organizations and programs
– Discovery and improvement of promotion tasks for inspiration of entrepreneurship and start-up vitalization
– Discovery and improvement of promotional tasks for venture business as well as for small and medium-sized businesses
– Cooperation with authorities related to the creative economy
– Training program development for future entrepreneurs
– Promotion and support for the organization and businesses to support the start-ups
– Support for the establishment and evaluation of policy related to the creative economy

Regional Creative Economy Committee

– Discovery and promotion of projects as well as private and public cooperation tasks related to the local creative economy

These governance changes mean a conversion to the creative economy innovation centers scheduled to be installed in all local governments until 2015. This also calls for a concentration of all local R&D resources in the creative economy innovation centers that will promote specialized local businesses by matching them with large businesses on a 1:1 basis. It also relies on the networking of these innovation centers to disseminate creative economy philosophy and outcome creation.

References

Park Geun-hye Government
Economy of South Korea